Crozat is a French surname. Notable people with the surname include:

Antoine Crozat (1655–1738), French merchant, the first proprietary owner of French Louisiana
Pierre Crozat (1661–1740), French art collector

French-language surnames